Edlin is a line editor included with MS-DOS and later Microsoft operating systems.  

Edlin may also refer to:

 Aaron Edlin, US economist
 Robert Thomas Edlin, recipient of US Distinguished Service Cross